Nothing Til Blood, formerly known as Aim for the Day, is an American Christian hardcore and Christian metal band from Birmingham, Alabama. The band started making music in 2010, and their members at the time were lead vocalist, Amadeus Pryor, background vocalist and guitarist, Travis Higginbotham, guitarist, Cameron White, bassist, Matthew White, and drummer, William-Allen Johnson. They released one independently made album, Bloodcry, while they were Aim for the Day. The band released their first studio album, When Lambs Become Lions, in 2011 with Strike First Records. Their lead vocalist changed to Hector Becarra, at this juncture of leaving Strike First Records. They went independent, releasing another studio album, Still Standing, in 2014.

Background
Nothing Til Blood, formerly Aim for the Day, is a Christian hardcore and Christian metal band from Birmingham, Alabama. Their members were at its inception were lead vocalist, Amadeus Pryor, background vocalist and guitarist, Travis Higginbotham, guitarist, Cameron White, bassist, Matthew White, and drummer, William-Allen Johnson. Amadeus Pryor left the group after their first studio album was released, and they picked up a new front man and lead vocalist, Hector Becarra.

Music history
The band commenced as a musical entity in 2010, with their first release, Bloodcry, that was released by independently, while they were, Aim for the Day. Their first studio album, When Lambs Become Lions, was released by Strike First Records on September 27, 2011. The subsequent album, Still Standing, was released on February 18, 2014.

Members
Current members
 Hector Becarra - lead vocals (2012–present)
 Travis Higginbotham - background vocals, guitar (2010–present; Gideon)
 Cameron White - guitar (2010–present)
 Matthew White - bass (2010–present)
 William-Allen Johnson - drums (2010–present)
Former members
Amadeus Pryor – lead vocals (2010-2012)

Discography
Albums
 Bloodcry (2010, Independent), As Aim for the Day
 When Lambs Become Lions (September 27, 2011, Strike First)
 Still Standing (February 18, 2014, Independent)

EPs
 Ego Death + Rebirth (May 25, 2016, Independent)

References

External links
Official website

2010 establishments in Alabama
Musical groups established in 2010
Facedown Records artists
Strike First Records artists
Musical groups from Birmingham, Alabama
Metalcore musical groups from Alabama